The Fourchette River (in French: rivière Fourchette) is a tributary of the Filkars River whose current flows successively into the Beaurivage River, the west bank of the Chaudière River and the south bank of the St. Lawrence River.

The Fourchette river flows through the municipalities of Saint-Sylvestre and Saint-Patrice-de-Beaurivage, in the Lotbinière Regional County Municipality, in the administrative region of Chaudière-Appalaches, in Québec, in Canada.

Geography 

The main neighboring watersheds of the Fourchette river are:
 north side: Filkars River, Beaurivage River;
 east side: Beaurivage River, Nadeau River, Vallée River, Chaudière River;
 south side: Saint-André River, Filkars River, Palmer River;
 west side: Saint-André River, Armagh River, Saint-Georges River, rivière aux Chevreuils.

From its source located in Saint-Sylvestre, the Fourchette River flows on  divided into the following segments:
  towards the northeast, in Saint-Sylvestre;
  towards the north, forming a large curve to the east, as it traverses  in two segments in Saint-Patrice-de-Beaurivage because of an appendage to the south of the territory of Saint-Patrice-de-Beaurivage;
  towards the north-west, in Saint-Sylvestre, then in Saint-Patrice-de-Beaurivage, until the route du Moulin;
  westward, in Saint-Patrice-de-Beaurivage, to Craig Road;
  north-west, up to its confluence.

The Fourchette river empties on the south bank of the Filkars River in the municipality of Saint-Patrice-de-Beaurivage.

Toponymy 
The toponym "rivière Fourchette" was made official on August 8, 1977, at the Commission de toponymie du Québec.

See also 

 List of rivers of Quebec

References 

Rivers of Chaudière-Appalaches
Lotbinière Regional County Municipality